Gabriela Cowperthwaite (born 1971) is an American/Brazilian filmmaker. She has directed documentaries and feature films, and she also produces, edits, writes, and directs for television and documentary films. Her films often deal with social, cultural, and environmental issues relating to real life events. Her most notable film is Blackfish (2013), which received a BAFTA nomination for Best Documentary.

Early life and education
Cowperthwaite's mother was a Brazilian psychoanalyst, and her father was an American real estate developer. She grew up in Denver, speaking Portuguese as her first language. She also played soccer in her youth.

She attended Occidental College in Los Angeles, and graduated with a degree in political science. She also attended USC for Graduate School and graduated with an MA in Political Science.

Career 
After college, Cowperthwaite pursued a Political Science graduate degree at USC. Cowperthwaite was first involved in commissioned work on television for more than 12 years. She spent time writing, directing, and producing documentary programs for outlets such as National Geographic, ESPN, Animal Planet,  The History Channel, and Discovery Channel.

In 2010, she directed City Lax: An Urban Lacrosse Story, making her debut in independent feature documentary-making. The subject was chosen by her classmate Tor Myhren, and the documentary tells the story of Tor's brother Erik, who at the time was an elementary school teacher that put together a lacrosse team in a rough urban neighbourhood to play a rich white kids' sport. The film debuted on ESPN in 2010.

In 2013, Cowperthwaite directed her second documentary Blackfish, which premiered at the 2013 Sundance Film Festival, and found a larger audience on television via her distribution partner CNN. Blackfish is a  controversial documentary, as it tells the story of Tilikum, an orca at the SeaWorld theme park in Orlando, Florida who killed its trainer, Dawn Brancheau. The film  investigates the treatment of orcas in captivity through news and archival footage, interviews of former trainers and marine mammal experts, and questioning the ethics of captivity. The film created a new movement, called "The Blackfish Effect", and in 2016 SeaWorld announced it would stop breeding orcas and put an end to all orca performances by 2019, which was largely attributed to the film.

In 2017, her first feature film, Megan Leavey was released. A drama based on real events, the film follows a corporal in the U.S. Marine's K9 unit, working with a German shepherd named Rex to detect explosives and weapons during the Iraq War.

In 2019, Cowperthwaite directed Our Friend, a drama film starring Casey Affleck, Dakota Johnson, and Jason Segel, revolving around real-life couple Nicole and Matthew Teague. Faced with Nicole's impending death, they have their best friend move in with them to help them out.

Filmography 
 City Lax: An Urban Lacrosse Story (2010)
 Blackfish (2013)
 Megan Leavey (2017)
 Our Friend (2019)
 The Grab (2022)
 I.S.S. (TBA)

Awards 
Cowperthwaite's 2010 documentary, City Lax: An Urban Lacrosse Story, received the July prize for Best Documentary as well as the Audience Award at the Sonoma International Film Festival.

Blackfish (2013) earned a BAFTA nomination and an International Documentary Association Award nomination. It also made the shortlist for the Oscar feature documentary.

Personal life 
Cowperthwaite lives in Los Angeles with her husband and two sons.

References

External links
Gabriela Cowperthwaite at IMDb
Gabriela Cowperthwaite at Supply & Demand

American documentary filmmakers
Living people
American women documentary filmmakers
Occidental College alumni
21st-century American women
1971 births